Kingsley Went (born 19 August 1981) is a Zimbabwean cricketer. He played sixteen first-class matches between 1999 and 2005.

See also
 CFX Academy cricket team

References

External links
 

1981 births
Living people
Zimbabwean cricketers
CFX Academy cricketers
Manicaland cricketers
Sportspeople from Harare